Antonio Piolanti (7 August 1911 – 28 September 2001) was an Italian Roman Catholic priest and a Thomist theologian and dogmatist. He was from 1957 to 1969 Rector of the Pontifical Lateran University.

Biography 

Piolanti was born on 7 August 1911 in Predappio, Emilia-Romagna, Italy. He received priestly ordination in 1934. From 1938 to 1955 he was professor of theology at the Ateneo di Propaganda Fide (Pontifical Urban University), he also taught from 1945 at the Lateran University. From 1955 to 1962 he was dean of the theological faculty at the Urbania and 1957 at the Lateran University. From 1957 to 1969 Antonio Piolanti was rector of the Pontifical Lateran University. He was advisor to the Roman Curia, as well as several congregations. He was (1969 to 2001) Vice President of the Pontificia Accademia di San Tommaso. He died on 28 September 2001 in Rome.

1911 births
2001 deaths
People from Predappio
20th-century Italian Roman Catholic theologians
Thomists
Italian educators
20th-century Italian Roman Catholic priests